O'Laughlin is an Irish surname. Notable people with the surname include:

 Cindy O'Laughlin, American politician and member of the Missouri Senate
 Jeanne O'Laughlin (1929–2019), co-founder of Barry University in Florida, USA
 John Callan O'Laughlin (1873–1949), publisher of the Army and Navy Journal

See also 
 Ó Lochlainn
 O'Loughlin